Krasna is a village in Nadvirna Raion of Ivano-Frankivsk Oblast of Ukraine. It belongs to the Nadvirna settlement hromada, one of the hromadas of Ukraine.

Geography
The village is located 4 kilometers from Lanchyn and 12 kilometers from Nadvirna. The town is next to the Krasna river, and the Krasna forest preserve is located to the west.

History
The first written mention of the village dates back to 1455. There is an eight-year school, a library, a medical center with a maternity ward, a theater, a communication branch and a bank in Krasna.

References

Villages in Nadvirna Raion